Fledborough is a hamlet in Nottinghamshire, England. Although now redundant, the Anglian parish church of St Gregory's, earned the hamlet the nickname of "the Gretna Green of the Midlands" in the 18th century, due to the ease in which couples could obtain a marriage licence from the Reverend W. Sweetapple.

The Bassett family effectively owned Fledborough from the fourteenth century to the seventeenth.

See also
 Fledborough railway station
 Fledborough Viaduct

Notes

Hamlets in Nottinghamshire
Bassetlaw District